Ghost Mamma is a 1996 South Korean romance fantasy film.

Plot
The film tells the story of a happily married couple, Ji-seok and In-ju, who lived with their son Dabin until a tragic accident which left Dabin alive but caused In-ju's death one year later. Ji-seok tries to commit suicide but In-ju visits him as a ghost to comfort him.

Cast
Choi Jin-sil ... In-ju
Kim Seung-woo ... Ji-seok
Park Sang-ah
Kwon Hae-hyo ... Byun Joo-ho
Jeon Soo-kyung
Lee Taek-geun
Park Ji-seong
Jung Hye-sun
Jo Sang-gun
Ryu Tae-ho

External links
 
 

1996 films
1990s ghost films
South Korean ghost films
South Korean romantic fantasy films
South Korean romantic drama films
1996 romantic drama films
South Korean fantasy drama films
1990s romantic fantasy films
1990s English-language films